Sean Michaels (born 1982) is a Scottish-born novelist, music critic, and blogger. Based in Montreal, Quebec, he has written about music for publications such as The Guardian, McSweeney's, The Believer, Pitchfork,  Maisonneuve, The Observer,  The Wire  and The National Post. His weekly music column, Heartbeats, debuted in The Globe & Mail in 2015.

His novel Us Conductors won the 2014 Scotiabank Giller Prize.

Early life 

Michaels was born in Stirling, Scotland. He was raised in Ottawa, Ontario. He relocated to Montreal, Quebec to study at McGill University.

Early career 

Michaels initially came to prominence as founder of Said the Gramophone, one of the first mp3 blogs, where he was among the first music critics to write about Arcade Fire, Beirut,  Nicolas Jaar and Feist. His music criticism is known for a dreamy, literary writing style, contributing to his work as a writer in residence for events like the Dawson City Music Festival and, since 2009, Sappyfest. Six years after its founding, Said the Gramophone was recognized by Time as one of the world's 25 best blogs.

His articles about travel, food and culture have appeared in Brick, The Walrus, Resorts and Great Hotels, and Reader's Digest. In 2010, Michaels was awarded a gold prize at the Canadian National Magazine Awards for a feature concerning the Parisian art guerrillas Les UX; this article first appeared in Brick and was later re-published by Gizmodo. He received a second National Magazine Award in 2013, for an article on Canadian circus, published by The Walrus.

Michaels also writes short fiction; his short stories has been published in Maisonneuve, The New Quarterly, The Lifted Brow, and the anthologies We Are the Friction and The Art of Trespassing.

Since 2009, Michaels has given several lectures on contemporary journalism and the music industry, including appearances at McGill University, Emerson College, Concordia University, and the Pop Montreal Symposium. He is a member of the Polaris Music Prize jury and assisted on the grand jury which selected Godspeed You! Black Emperor's 'Allelujah! Don't Bend! Ascend! as the best Canadian album of 2013.

In 2010, Michaels formed an absurdist improv duo with Vinny Francois called Venezuela. They performed several early shows at the Montreal Improv Theatre. In 2011, they were featured at the Montreal Fringe Festival and opened for Tig Notaro.  His most recent theatrical credit is in Mark Slutsky's acclaimed short film Sorry, Rabbi as Hasid #5.

Us Conductors 

Michaels' debut novel, Us Conductors, was published by Random House Canada and Tin House Books (US) in 2014. This book is inspired by the lives of Léon Theremin, inventor of the theremin, and the musician Clara Rockmore.

Us Conductors was named the winner of the 2014 Scotiabank Giller Prize. In his acceptance speech for the award, Michaels said that as a new author, it was an "unimaginable gift" to receive support from writers and publishers. He also addressed recent scandals surrounding abuse in arts communities - notably claims against former Giller host Jian Ghomeshi. "There are people in our little corner of culture who behave monstrously," he said. "We have to reckon with that, and change it. Each of us does." The novel was also subsequently awarded the Hugh MacLennan Prize for Fiction and named as a nominee for the International Dublin Literary Award, the Amazon.ca First Novel Award, the inaugural Kirkus Prize and the CLMP's Firecracker award for fiction.

References

External links
Said the Gramophone
Official website for Us Conductors

1982 births
Canadian bloggers
Canadian male non-fiction writers
Canadian male novelists
Journalists from Montreal
Journalists from Ontario
Male bloggers
Writers from Montreal
Writers from Ottawa
Living people
Canadian male short story writers
Canadian writers about music
People from Stirling
Scottish emigrants to Canada
21st-century Canadian short story writers
21st-century Canadian male writers
21st-century Canadian novelists